Pierre Harache (also known as Peter Harache) was an English goldsmith of French birth. On 21 July 1682 he became the first Huguenot goldsmith to be admitted to the Goldsmiths' Company in London. His surviving pieces show a simplicity of form with the ornament largely applied or engraved. Confusion often arises between the work of Pierre Harache and that of his son Pierre Harache (II) (born 1653; fl 1698–1717), as their registered marks are similar.

See also
 Harache family

References
 

English goldsmiths
Huguenots
Year of death unknown
Year of birth unknown